The Tournoi de Québec (sponsored as Coupe Banque Nationale or known as National Bank Cup in English-language media) was a WTA Tour International level tennis tournament held in Quebec City, Quebec, Canada. Held from 1993 to 2018, the tournament was the last women's professional tennis tournament still played on indoor carpet courts. It was held at the PEPS stadium. The tournament was known as Challenge Bell from the first edition to 2013.

In 1997, Dutchwoman Brenda Schultz-McCarthy defeated Belgian Dominique Van Roost to win her second title in Quebec City (also won in 1995 and finalist in 1994), the only woman in the history of the tournament to do so. The following year, American Tara Snyder won her first WTA Tour title with a hard fought victory over fellow American and former top 10 player Chanda Rubin (Rubin was also runner-up in 1999 and won the tournament in 2000), as she saved two match points during the match. In 2006, top-seed and future Wimbledon champion Marion Bartoli of France defeated Russian Olga Puchkova 6–0, 6–0, the first double bagel in a WTA Tour final for 13 years.

Other players who have won the event and gone on to win Grand Slam titles include 1999 champion Jennifer Capriati, 2003 champion Maria Sharapova, who both went on to become World No. 1. American Lindsay Davenport, a three-time Grand Slam champion, won the event in 2007, in only her third event after returning to the tour after giving birth to her son. The last edition of the tournament was held in 2018.

Past finals

Singles

Doubles

References

External links
Official website

 
WTA Tour
Tennis tournaments in Canada
Indoor tennis tournaments
Sport in Quebec City
Tennis in Quebec
Recurring sporting events established in 1993
1993 establishments in Quebec
Defunct tennis tournaments in Canada
Carpet court tennis tournaments